Unification or Death, popularly known as the Black Hand, was a secret military society formed in 1901 by officers in the Army of the Kingdom of Serbia. It gained a reputation for its alleged involvement in the assassination of Archduke Franz Ferdinand in Sarajevo in 1914 and for the earlier assassination of the Serbian royal couple in 1903, under the aegis of Captain Dragutin Dimitrijević ( "Apis").

The society formed to unite all of the territories with a South Slavic majority was not then ruled by either Serbia or Montenegro. It took inspiration primarily from the unification of Italy in 1859–1870 but also from the unification of Germany in 1871. Through its connections to the June 1914 assassination of Archduke Franz Ferdinand in Sarajevo, carried out by the members of the youth movement Young Bosnia, the Black Hand is often viewed as instrumental in starting  World War I (1914–1918) by precipitating the July Crisis of 1914, which eventually led to Austria-Hungary's invasion of the Kingdom of Serbia in August 1914.

Background

Apis' conspiracy group and the May Coup

  
In August 1901, a group of lower officers headed by captain Dragutin Dimitrijević "Apis" established a conspiracy group (called the Black Hand in literature), against the dynasty. The first meeting was held on 6 September 1901. In attendance were captains Radomir Aranđelović, Milan F. Petrović, and Dragutin Dimitrijević, as well as lieutenants Antonije Antić, Dragutin Dulić, Milan Marinković, and Nikodije Popović. They made a plan to kill the royal couple—King Alexander I Obrenović and Queen Draga.  On the night of 28/29 May 1903, Captain Apis personally led a group of Army officers who murdered the royal couple at the Old Palace in Belgrade  (Old Style). Along with the royal couple, the conspirators killed Prime Minister Dimitrije Cincar-Marković, Minister of the Army Milovan Pavlović, and General-Adjutant Lazar Petrović. This became known as the May Coup.

Narodna Odbrana
 
On 8 October 1908, just two days after Austria annexed Bosnia and Herzegovina, Serbian ministers, officials, and generals held a meeting at the City Hall in Belgrade. They founded a semi-secret society, the Narodna Odbrana ("National Defense") which gave Pan-Serbism a focus and an organization. The purpose of the group was to liberate Serbs under the Austro-Hungarian occupation. They also shared anti-Austrian propaganda and organized spies and saboteurs to operate within the occupied provinces. Satellite groups were formed in Slovenia, Bosnia, Herzegovina, and Istria. The Bosnian group became deeply associated with local groups of pan-Serb activists such as Mlada Bosna ("Young Bosnia").

Establishment
 
 
Unification or Death was established at the beginning of May 1911, and the original constitution of the organization was signed on 9 May. Ljuba Čupa, Bogdan Radenković, and Vojislav Tankosić wrote the constitution of the organization, modeled after similar German secret nationalist associations and the Italian Carbonari. The organization was mentioned in the Serbian parliament as the "Black Hand" in late 1911.

By 1911–12, Narodna Odbrana had established ties with the Black Hand, and the two became "parallel in action and overlapping in membership".

1911–13
The organization used the magazine Pijemont (the Serbian name for Piedmont, the kingdom that led the unification of Italy under the House of Savoy) for the dissemination of their ideas. The magazine was founded by Ljuba Čupa in August 1911.

1914
By 1914, the group had hundreds of members, many of them Serbian Army officers. The goal of uniting Serb-inhabited territories was implemented by training guerilla fighters and saboteurs. The Black Hand was organized at the grassroots level in cells of three to five members, supervised by district committees and by a Central Committee in Belgrade, whose ten-member executive committee was primarily led by Colonel Dragutin Dimitrijević "Apis". To ensure secrecy, members rarely knew much more than the other members of their own cell and one superior above them. New members swore the oath:

The Black Hand took over the terrorist actions of Narodna Odbrana and deliberately worked
to obscure any distinctions between the two groups, trading on the prestige and network of the older organization. Black Hand members held important army and government positions. Crown Prince Alexander was an enthusiastic financial supporter. The group held influence over government appointments and policies. The Serbian government was fairly well-informed of Black Hand activities.

Friendly relations had fairly well cooled by 1914. The Black Hand was displeased with Prime Minister Nikola Pašić and thought that he did not act aggressively enough for the Pan-Serb cause. The Black Hand engaged in a bitter power struggle over several issues, such as who would control territories that Serbia had annexed during the Balkan Wars. By then, disagreeing with the Black Hand was dangerous, as political murder was one of its tools.

In 1914, Apis allegedly decided that Archduke Franz Ferdinand, the heir-apparent of Austria, should be assassinated, as he was trying to pacify the Serbians, which would prevent a revolution if he was successful. Towards that end, three young Bosnian Serbs were allegedly recruited to kill the Archduke. They were certainly trained in bomb throwing and marksmanship by current and former members of the Serbian military. Gavrilo Princip, Nedeljko Čabrinović, and Trifko Grabež were smuggled across the border back into Bosnia by a chain of contacts similar to the Underground Railroad.
The decision to kill the Archduke was initiated by Apis and not sanctioned by the full Executive Committee (if Apis was involved at all, a question that remains in dispute).

Those involved probably realised that their plot would result in war between Austria and Serbia and had every reason to expect that Russia would side with Serbia. They likely did not, however, anticipate that the assassination would start the chain of events leading to World War I.
Others in the government and some of the Black Hand Executive Council were not as confident of Russian aid since Russia had recently let them down.

When word of the plot allegedly percolated through Black Hand leadership and the Serbian government (Prime Minister Pašić was informed of two armed men being smuggled across the border, but it is not clear if Pašić knew of the planned assassination), Apis was supposedly told not to proceed. He may have made a half-hearted attempt to intercept the young assassins at the border, but they had already crossed. Other sources say the attempted 'recall' began only after the assassins had reached Sarajevo. The 'recall' appears to have made Apis look like a loose cannon and the young assassins like independent zealots. The 'recall' took place fully two weeks before the Archduke's visit. The assassins idled in Sarajevo for a month. Nothing more was done to stop them.

Ideology

The group encompassed a range of ideological outlooks, from conspiratorially-minded army officers to idealistic youths, sometimes tending towards republicanism, despite their patrons in nationalistic royal circles. The movement's leader, Apis, had been instrumental in the June 1903 coup which had brought King Petar Karađorđević to the Serbian throne following 45 years of rule by the rival Obrenović dynasty. The group was denounced as nihilist by the Austro-Hungarian press and compared to the Russian People's Will and the Chinese Assassination Corps.

Legacy
In 1938 a conspiracy group to overthrow the Yugoslav regency was founded by, among others, members of the Serbian Cultural Club (SKK). The organization was modeled after the Black Hand, including the recruitment process. Two members of the Black Hand, Antonije Antić and Velimir Vemić, were the organization's military advisors.

See also
 Serbian Chetnik Organization
 Young Bosnia
 Serb revolutionary organizations
 Secret society

References

Sources

Further reading

External links

 
 Lutz, Hermann. "The Serbian 'Black Hand'," The Freeman, Vol. 7, N°. 164, pp. 179–81, 2 May 1923.
 John Paul Newman: Black Hand, in: 1914–1918 online. International Encyclopedia of the First World War.

 
Serbian revolutionary organizations
History of Austria-Hungary
Kingdom of Serbia
Serbia in World War I
Ottoman Empire in World War I
Causes of World War I
Serbian nationalism
Christian fundamentalism
Secret societies in Serbia
Assassination of Archduke Franz Ferdinand of Austria
Serbian irredentism
History of the Serbs of Bosnia and Herzegovina
History of the Serbs of Croatia
1901 establishments in Serbia
Political history of Serbia
Organizations established in 1901
Defunct organizations based in Serbia
Austria-Hungary–Serbia relations
Vardar Macedonia (1918–1941)
Revolutionary organizations against the Ottoman Empire
Revolutionary organizations against Austria-Hungary
Yugoslavism
Freemasonry-related controversies